Mister Philippines 2008 is a male pageant in the Philippines. The winner of Mister Philippines 2008, Jeff Surio represented the Philippines in the 3rd Mister International male pageant was held in Tainan, Taiwan on November 24, 2008. 30 contestants competed for the title, marking the biggest edition in the pageant history. Mister Philippines 2008 is a Top 10 Semi-finalist.

See also
 Manhunt International
 Mister World

External links
 Mister Philippines website

Mister International